Pamela Martin (born 1953) is an American-born television reporter and news anchor on Canadian television who now works as a director of engagement for the British Columbia Liberal political party.

Biography
Born in Detroit, Michigan, she immigrated to British Columbia, and joined Victoria's CHEK-TV as a co-host and producer in 1975. She moved to Vancouver's CKNW AM 980 the next year and became that station's first female reporter. She accepted an offer from BCTV (then Vancouver's CTV affiliate) in 1977, and anchored at that station until 2001, when she joined CTV British Columbia (CIVT). She formerly co-anchored the weekday 6:00 pm newscasts on CTV British Columbia alongside Bill Good.

On December 7, 2010, Martin announced her resignation from her position as Anchor on CTV News Vancouver along with her co-host Bill Good. Their last broadcast aired on December 29, 2010.

On January 5, 2011, Martin announced that she had joined politician Christy Clark's campaign team for the British Columbia Liberal Party Leadership race after another television reporter, Chris Olsen (from CTV's Olsen on Your Side) resigned as Clark's media aide. He received $67,000 in severance. Clark was named party leader March 14, 2011. Martin defended the shift from journalism to politics.

In September 2013, Martin left her $130,000 government position in the premier's office to be the director of engagement for the British Columbia Liberal party, in order to campaign for Clark in the May 2014 election.

In 1968, Martin won the Miss Teen USA title (not to be confused with the Miss Teen USA pageant established in 1983).

Filmography

References

External links

 CTV BC Bio

1953 births
Canadian television news anchors
Living people
Canadian television actresses
Canadian women television journalists
CTV Television Network people